The Persian-language magazine Habl al-Matin ("Strong cord"), one of the most important political journals during the Iran Constitutional Revolution, was published daily in Teheran from 1907 to 1908.

One volume with a total of 274 issues was published. Founded as subsidiary of the magazine Habl al-Matin which was published in Calcutta it should offer current news about Iran. The founders and owners were Moayyed-al-Eslam, publisher of the Indian Habl al-Matin and his younger brother Sayyed Hasan. As of the 20th edition, Shaikh Yajya Kashani, a well-known journalist and owner of the magazines Majles, Irān and Irān-e emruz was nominated as editor. During the Constitutional Revolution, Hasan used the journal in order to support the movement in June 1908. The magazine was suspended after the coup d'état of Mohammed Ali Shah and Sayyed Hasan was exiled.

References

External links
 Habl al-Matin in Encyclopædia Iranica
 Online-Version: Ḥabl al-matīn

1907 establishments in Iran
1908 disestablishments in Iran
Defunct magazines published in Iran
Defunct political magazines
Magazines established in 1907
Magazines disestablished in 1908
Magazines published in Tehran
Persian-language magazines